Zoda's Revenge: StarTropics II is an action-adventure video game developed and published by Nintendo for the Nintendo Entertainment System.  It is the sequel to StarTropics. It was released in North America in 1994, making it the second-to-last first-party game released on the NES (Wario's Woods being the last), and the final game developed by Nintendo exclusively for the NES (Wario's Woods having also been released for the Super NES), excluding re-releases and international distributions of others also by Nintendo.

It was released on the Wii Virtual Console in December 2008 in North America and on July 10, 2009, in the PAL regions. It was released on the Wii U Virtual Console in Europe on September 3, 2015, in Australia on September 4, 2015, and in North America on May 26, 2016.

Gameplay
Zoda's Revenge runs through nine chapters, although the first is story-only. Each chapter besides the first takes place in a different time and place and holds one or more bosses, multiple areas, many weapons, medicine, obstacles and puzzles. While the original StarTropics took place almost exclusively on a series of tropical islands, its sequel takes place in a variety of locales, such as the Stone Age, Ancient Egypt, the Wild West, the Middle Ages, and Victorian England in old time periods.

During the game, Mike meets many important historical and fictional figures throughout his journey through time. These consist of Cleopatra, Merlin, Sherlock Holmes, Leonardo da Vinci and King Arthur, who help him to achieve his goal of finding the Tetrads (resembling Tetris pieces, and renamed "Blocks" in the Virtual Console release) and defeating Zoda's three clones.

Zoda's Revenge runs on a modified engine of the original StarTropics, with health continuing to be measured by The Legend of Zelda style heart containers. Unlike the original StarTropics, Mike is no longer limited to moving in "squares", and now can move in eight different directions and can change directions in mid-jump. He now uses various weapons, including Tink's Axe, Cleopatra's Bronze Dagger, and Leonardo's Katana, as well as an upgradable projectile magic attack that he learns from Merlin called the Psychic Shock Wave. As opposed to the Island Yo-Yo, Shooting Star and the Super Nova he had in the first game, only the psychic weapons are affected by the number of heart containers Mike has filled. Occasionally, Mike encounters enemies that react differently depending on which weapon is used to attack.

Plot
The story begins with Mike Jones receiving a telepathic message from Mica, the princess of the Argonians whom Mike had rescued in the previous game. She tells Mike how to solve a cipher that he and his uncle, Dr. J, found on the side of the Argonians’ space pod. Mike goes to see Dr. J, and together, they solve the cipher and read it aloud. This causes Mike to be flung into the past. He arrives in the Stone Age. After helping a tribe of cave men retrieve their children from a flesh-eating wild boar, he finds an object, which Mica telepathically identifies as a Tetrad (or "Block" in the Virtual Console version). From here, Mike's journey sends him to different eras throughout Earth’s history to retrieve the rest of the Tetrads, such as Ancient Egypt, the Renaissance period, and the Middle Ages.

During one time jump, in which Mike helps Sherlock Holmes prevent a robbery at the museum, he discovers that Zoda, the alien leader that he had destroyed in his previous adventure, is alive in Holmes’ time period and is also trying to collect the Tetrads. Mike defeats Zoda again and claims the Tetrad that Zoda tried to steal. Based on the fact that Zoda referred to himself as "Zoda-X", Holmes deduces that there are likely to be a Zoda-Y and Zoda-Z somewhere in time, as well. This is proven to be true, as Mike later faces and defeats Zoda-Y in Transylvania. After he recovers the last of the Tetrads, Mica contacts Mike and tells him that Zoda-Z has attacked C-Island, where the Argonians are staying. Mike returns to the present and faces Zoda-Z in combat. After finally defeating Zoda, the Chief of C-Island (who boasts that "Tetris" is his middle name, though the Virtual Console rerelease changes it to "Puzzle") helps Mike put the Tetrads together. When they are together, Hirocon, the leader of the Argonians and Mica's father, appears and explains he had sealed himself in the Tetrads and scattered them across time before Zoda's attack. He leads the Argonians back to their home planet to rebuild.

Reception 

Electronic Gaming Monthlys five reviewers said the game has "plenty of action" but "really doesn't stand out and is too little too late for a dated system". GamePros Manny LaMancha gave the NES version a generally positive review, saying that the graphics and controls, while below average compared to its contemporaries, are an improvement over the first game in the series, and concluded that "this playful sequel does the hardware proud". LaMancha especially praised the quality of the edutainment.

References

External links

1994 video games
Action-adventure games
Nintendo Entertainment System games
Nintendo Integrated Research and Development games
Science fantasy video games
Video games about time travel
Video game sequels
Video games developed in the United States
Virtual Console games
Virtual Console games for Wii U
Video games set in prehistory
Video games set in England
Video games set in Egypt
Video games set in the Middle Ages
Video games set in Oceania
Video games set in the United States
Video games set in Transylvania
Video games set in the 19th century